HHG may refer to: 

 HHG Corporation, Extreme Championship Wrestling
 HHG Group, former name of Henderson Group, a global investment management company
 High harmonic generation, a non-linear process during which a target is illuminated by an intense laser pulse
 The Hitchhiker's Guide to the Galaxy
 Household goods, a cargo shipping category
 Hungry, Hungry Ghost, a German band

See also
 Huntington Airport (disambiguation)